Hou Sizhi (侯思止) (died 693) was a secret police official during the Chinese dynasty Tang Dynasty and Wu Zetian's Zhou Dynasty.

It is not known when Hou Sizhi was born, but it is known that he was from Tang's capital prefecture Yong Prefecture (雍州, roughly modern Xi'an, Shaanxi).  He was said to be poor and unable to make a living from selling bread, and so he served as a servant at the household of the general Gao Yuanli in Heng Prefecture (恆州, roughly modern Shijiazhuang, Hebei).  In 690, he was accused of inappropriate conduct, and the prefect of Heng Prefecture, Pei Zhen, was set to sentence him to caning.  A local official advised him to make a secret report to Wu Zetian, who was then empress dowager and regent over her son Emperor Ruizong, and he did so, accusing Pei and Emperor Ruizong's granduncle Li Yuanming the Prince of Shu of plotting treason together.  Empress Dowager Wu, already looking for excuses to act against senior members of the Li imperial clan, exiled Li Yuanming and executed Pei and Li Yuanming's son Li Dan the Prince of Yuzhang.  She gave Hou a general title, but Hou offered to become an assistant censor, which was ranked lower but which had the authority to investigate crimes.  Empress Dowager Wu asked him, "You are illiterate.  How can you be a censor?"  Hou responded, "A xiezhi is also illiterate, but it could use its horn to hit the evil!"  (The xiezhi was a mythical one-horned animal that was intelligent, and whenever it saw two people fighting, it would use its horn to hit the wrong side.)  Empress Dowager was pleased and made him a censor.  On one occasion, she was set to award a house to Hou that was seized from a person accused of treason.  Hou declined and stated, "I hate treasonous individuals, and I do not want a house from one!"  She was further impressed.

In 692 (by which time Wu Zetian had seized the throne from Emperor Ruizong and established her own Zhou Dynasty), a number of officials—the chancellors Ren Zhigu, Di Renjie, and Pei Xingben, along with other officials Pei Xuanli, Lu Xian, Wei Yuanzhong, and Li Sizhen -- were accused of treason.  The secret police official Lai Junchen was in charge of the investigations, but Hou was specifically charged with interrogating Wei.  Wei refused to admit to treason, and Hou reacted by having him dragged on the ground feet-first.  Wei sarcastically stated, "I am so unlucky that it is like having fallen from a donkey with my feet stuck to the stirrup, and being dragged by the beast."  Hou, in anger, increased the speed of the dragging, and Wei responded, "Hou Sizhi, if you want my head, just cut it off.  Do not ask me to admit treason."  He further criticized Hou for using vulgar speech unfit for an imperial official—which, oddly, caused Hou to stop the torture and thank him for teaching him to speak properly.  (Ultimately, the seven officials were spared their lives but were exiled.)  Hou, however, continued to be known for his vulgar speech, which the other officials often joked about.  When the censor Huo Xianke once laughed about Hou's speech, Hou, in anger, reported it to Wu Zetian.  Wu Zetian rebuked Huo for laughing about one of her trusted officials—but when Huo then informed Wu of Hou's vulgarities, she laughed as well.

Meanwhile, Hou, seeing that Lai had divorced his previous wife and forced the daughter of one Wang Qingshen, of a prominent clan, to marry him, also wanted to marry a daughter from a prominent clan—the daughter of one Li Ziyi -- and this matter was discussed by the chancellors.  The chancellor Li Zhaode thought this to be extremely inappropriate and vowed to act against Hou.  After Wu Zetian decreed in 693 that no one was to use silk, Hou was accused of improperly using silk, and Li Zhaode investigated the case.  He took this opportunity to have Hou battered to death.

References 
 Old Book of Tang, vol. 186, part 1.
 New Book of Tang, vol. 209.
 Zizhi Tongjian, vols. 204, 205.

693 deaths
Politicians from Xianyang
Tang dynasty politicians from Shaanxi
Year of birth unknown